HPO may refer to:

 HPO formalism, an approach to temporal quantum logic
 Hamilton Philharmonic Orchestra, a symphony orchestra based in Ontario, Canada
 High performance organization, a conceptual framework for organizations
 Highway Post Office, of the United States Postal Service
 Homeowner Protection Office, in British Columbia, Canada
 Hpon language, spoken in Burma
 Human Phenotype Ontology
 Humanist Party of Ontario, a political party in Canada
 Hydrogen peroxide, an oxidizer
 Premnaspirodiene oxygenase, an enzyme
 Hippo, a protein kinase involved in the Hippo signaling pathway
 Hyperparameter optimization, a technique used in automated machine learning